Lexington Township may refer to:

 Lexington Township, McLean County, Illinois
 Lexington Township, Scott County, Indiana
 Lexington Township, Clark County, Kansas
 Lexington Township, Johnson County, Kansas
 Lexington Township, Michigan
 Lexington Township, Le Sueur County, Minnesota
 Lexington Township, Lafayette County, Missouri
 Lexington Township, Davidson, North Carolina, in Davidson, North Carolina
 Lexington Township, Stark County, Ohio

Township name disambiguation pages